From There To Here: Greatest Hits is the first compilation album by American country music group Lonestar. In addition to chronicling the greatest hits from their first four studio albums, the album includes three newly recorded tracks "My Front Porch Looking In", "Walking in Memphis" (a cover of the 1991 Marc Cohn song) and "I Pray", as well as a second recording of their 2001 single "I'm Already There". "My Front Porch Looking In" and "Walking in Memphis" were both released as singles.

Content
From There to Here: Greatest Hits comprises thirteen tracks from the band's first four studio albums, arranged chronologically and starting with the band's 1995 debut single "Tequila Talkin'" from Lonestar's self-titled debut album up to "Not a Day Goes By" from 2001's I'm Already There. Four single releases are missing from the album: "When Cowboys Didn't Dance" and "Heartbroke Every Day" from Lonestar, "Say When" from Crazy Nights, and "Unusually Unusual" from I'm Already There.

Also included on this album are three new recordings: "My Front Porch Looking In" and "I Pray", as well as a cover of Marc Cohn's "Walking in Memphis". "My Front Porch Looking In" and "Walking in Memphis" were both released as singles in 2003, respectively reaching #1 and #8 on the U.S. country charts. Closing off the album on the North American version is a remix of "I'm Already There" entitled the "Message from Home". This remix is interspersed with telephone calls placed by family members of soldiers. The international version replaces this track with two other tracks: "Love Can Change Your Mind", recorded for the 1999 film Jesus, and "Gimme All Your Lovin'", a cover of a ZZ Top song recorded for the 2002 tribute album Sharp Dressed Men: A Tribute to ZZ Top.

Critical reception

Stephen Thomas Erlewine gave the album four stars out of five on Allmusic, where he called it a "fine retrospective" of the band's sound. In the Consumer Guide, however, Robert Christgau gave the album a "dud" rating and called it "a bad record whose details rarely merit further thought."

Track listing

Production
Don Cook and Wally Wilson – tracks 1-6
Dann Huff – tracks 7-17 (7-18 on international version)

Personnel on new tracks
Tim Akers - keyboards
Mike Brignardello - bass guitar
Michael Britt - electric guitar
Stuart Duncan - fiddle
Paul Franklin - steel guitar
Dann Huff - electric guitar
Paul Leim - drums
Richie McDonald – lead vocals
Jimmy Nichols - keyboards
Matt Rollings - keyboards
Dean Sams - keyboards, background vocals
Russell Terrell - background vocals
John Willis - acoustic guitar

Charts

Weekly charts

Year-end charts

Certifications

References

2003 greatest hits albums
Lonestar albums
BNA Records compilation albums
Albums produced by Dann Huff